Renee Danielle Foessel (born May 30, 1995) is a Canadian Paralympic athlete who competes in the discus throw in international level events. She also competes in javelin throw and shot put events internationally. She qualified for the 2020 Summer Paralympics, in Discus throw F38.

References

External links
 
 

1995 births
Living people
Athletes from Mississauga
Paralympic track and field athletes of Canada
Canadian female discus throwers
Canadian female javelin throwers
Canadian female shot putters
Athletes (track and field) at the 2016 Summer Paralympics
Medalists at the World Para Athletics Championships
Medalists at the 2015 Parapan American Games
Athletes (track and field) at the 2020 Summer Paralympics
20th-century Canadian women
21st-century Canadian women